Hard Road is the debut solo album from Australian singer Stevie Wright. The album's first single "Evie (Part 1)" was hugely successful and the title track was later covered on Rod Stewart's 1974 album Smiler. The album itself reach #2 on the Australian albums charts in 1974 was the 16th highest selling album in Australia that year. The compact disc is currently out-of-print and has become quite rare. A digital edition was available on iTunes as of June, 2014.

Background
In 1973, Harry Vanda and George Young returned to Australia after a period working in London paying off debts incurred while working as the Easybeats. They renewed their partnership with Albert Productions and as in-house producers began assembling a roster of artists for the label, among them their former Easybeats bandmate Stevie Wright.

Work soon commenced on an album with Wright, with Vanda and Young assembling a backing group that included themselves, pianist Warren Morgan of The Aztecs, and Malcolm Young, George's younger brother and the rhythm guitarist for AC/DC, on guitar. Wright wrote six songs for the album, while Vanda and Young wrote the remainder, including the title track and the three part "Evie".

Alternative covers
There are four different album covers for the album: The original Australian release, the Polydor release, the Atco release and the Australian compact disc reissue cover (which also serves as the artwork for the digital edition).

Re-issued vinyl
Hard Road was scheduled to be re-released worldwide on high quality, 180 mg vinyl for maximum dynamic and authenticity, April 19, 2014 through Albert Productions (Alberts). Renowned mastering expert Don Bartley converted the original analogue tapes to new vinyl masters, on vintage and retooled analogue gear.

Track listing

Side 1
 "Hard Road" (Harry Vanda - George Young) - 3:02 
 "Life Gets Better" (Stevie Wright) - 3:10 
 "The Other Side" (Stevie Wright) - 2:32 
 "I Got You Good" (Stevie Wright) - 3:16 
 "Dancing in the Limelight" (Stevie Wright) - 2:36 
 "Didn't I Take You Higher" (Harry Vanda, George Young) - 5:57

Side 2
 "Evie" - 11:01Part 1 (Let Your Hair Down) (Harry Vanda, George Young)Part 2 (Evie) (Harry Vanda, George Young)Part 3 (I'm Losing You) (Harry Vanda, George Young) 
 "Movin' On Up" (Stevie Wright) - 3:16 
 "Commando Line" (Stevie Wright) - 3:58

Personnel
Stevie Wright - vocals
George Young - bass
Harry Vanda - guitar
Malcolm Young - guitar
John Proud - drums
Warren Morgan - piano

Charts

Weekly charts

Year-end charts

References

1974 debut albums
Stevie Wright albums